Bendeela Pondage, completed in 1972, is an earth and rockfill embankment dam structure located on the Kangaroo River arm of Lake Yarrunga in New South Wales, Australia. It is located between Fitzroy Falls Dam and Tallowa Dam. The pondage, part of the Shoalhaven Scheme, functions as a buffer storage for out-of-balance flow between the two dams during hydro-electric power generation or water pumping at Kangaroo Valley and Bendeela pumping and power stations. The dam has no significant catchment but has been provided with a weir type spillway to protect the dam in the event of operational problems at the two pumping and power stations.

Bendeela Pumping and Power Station
A  pipeline connects Bendeela Pumping and Power Station with Bendeela Pondage.

See also

List of reservoirs and dams in Australia

References

Dams completed in 1972
Dams in New South Wales